Siret is a surname. Notable people with this surname include:
 Luis Siret (1860–1934), a Belgian-Spanish archaeologist and illustrator
 Nicolas Siret (1663–1754), a French composer and organist
 Adolphe Siret (1818—1888), Belgian historian, biographer, essayist, poet and writer
  (1745—1798), French  grammarian and philologist